Lugano Trophy may refer to:

Memorial Mario Albisetti, annual racewalking competition, also known as the Lugano Trophy and GP Città di Lugano
Lugano Trophy (World Race Walking Cup), World Race Walking Cup team ranking from 1961 to 1997
10th Lugano Trophy, a gymnastics junior competition